Vienna Hotel Group Limited, operating as Vienna Hotels ("Vienna Quality Chain Hotels," referring to Vienna, Austria) is a hotel chain in China, headquartered in Shenzhen North Railway Station, Bao'an District, Shenzhen.

As of 2012 the chain, which is considered mid-range, has 150 hotels with 20,000 rooms. Huang Deman is the founder and chairperson, and Wu Wei is the President and CEO. The English slogan is "High-quality Experience Low-cost payment". The Chinese slogan is "五星体验 二星消费" (wǔxīng tǐyàn èrxīng xiāofèi).

The company operates the brands Vienna Hotel, 3 Best Inn, Venus Hotel and Vienna International Hotel . Previously two of the brands were named Venus Crown Hotel 
 and Venus International Hotel 
.

Huang established the company in Shenzhen in 1993. It was the first Chinese hotel chain to have an "art and music"  theme. At one time Huang wanted to make a budget hotel chain, since around 2007 budget hotel chains were prospering, but after five years of operations he chose to make Vienna Hotel a mid-range chain. In 2011, the China Hotel Starlight Awards Lifetime Achievement Award  was awarded to Huang.

Corporate affairs
The company is headquartered in the Vienna International Hotel by the Shenzhen North Railway Station in Longhua District (formerly a part of Bao'an District), Shenzhen. The chain previously had its headquarters in Lüjing Garden, Futian District, Shenzhen.

Notes

References

External links

 Vienna Hotels 

Hotel chains in China
Hospitality companies of China
Companies based in Shenzhen
Hotels established in 1993
Chinese companies established in 1993
Chinese brands